John Hopkins may refer to:

Politics 
 John Hopkins (Bristol MP), member of the English House of Commons in 1601
 John Hopkins (died 1732), English merchant, Member of Parliament (MP) for St Ives 1710–15 and Ilchester 1715–22
 John Hopkins (lieutenant governor), lieutenant governor of South Carolina, 1806-1808
 John Patrick Hopkins (1858–1918), mayor of Chicago 1893–1895
 John Rout Hopkins (1829–1897), politician of Victoria, Australia
 Sir John Hopkins, 1st Baronet (1863–1946), English Conservative Party politician, Member of Parliament (MP) for St Pancras South East 1918–23 and 1924–29
 John Marquis Hopkins (1870–1912), Australian politician

Sports
 John Hopkins (cricketer) (born 1953), former Welsh cricketer
 John Hopkins (American football) (born c. 1969), American football placekicker
 John Hopkins (motorcyclist) (born 1983), American motorcycle racer

Arts and entertainment
 John Hopkins (actor) (born 1974), British actor
 John Hopkins (artist), Australian artist, winner of John McCaughey Prize in 1981
 John Hopkins (composer) (born 1949), British composer
 John Hopkins (conductor) (1927–2013), British-born Australian conductor
 John Hopkins (poet) (1675–?), English poet
 John Hopkins, psalmist (see Metrical psalter)
 John Hopkins (screenwriter) (1931–1998), British film and television writer
 John Driskell Hopkins (born 1971), guitarist and vocalist for the Zac Brown Band
 John Henry Hopkins Jr. (1820–1891), Pittsburgh-born writer of the carol "We Three Kings of Orient Are"
 John Hopkins the Third, a 1921 film featuring Béla Lugosi
 John Larkin Hopkins (1819–1873), English organist
 John Hopkins (travel writer) (born 1938), American travel writer
 John Christian Hopkins (born 1960), Narragansett journalist, author, poet and public speaker
 Jon Hopkins (born 1979), English musician and producer

Other
 John Hopkins (political activist) (1937–2015), also known as Hoppy, British activist, journalist and photographer
 John Hopkins (lawyer) (1936–2018), British academic
 John Henry Hopkins (1792–1868), Episcopal presiding bishop
 John Jay Hopkins (1893–1957), American executive; founder and president of General Dynamics
 John Hopkins (Royal Navy officer) (1834–1916), British admiral
 John Burroughs Hopkins (1742–1796), captain of the Continental Navy during the American Revolutionary War
 John Collier Frederick Hopkins, British mycologist
 John W. Hopkins, American serial killer and kidnapper

See also 
 Johns Hopkins (1795–1873), American businessman and philanthropist, benefactor of
 Johns Hopkins University
 Johns Hopkins Hospital
 Johns Hopkins School of Medicine